Office of the President can refer to:

 Office of the President of Brazil
 Office of the President of the People's Republic of China (entity in the Office of the General Secretary of the Chinese Communist Party)
 Office of the President (Republic of China)
 Office of the President of Croatia
 Office of the President of France
 Office of the Federal President of Germany
 Executive Office of the President of the Republic of Indonesia
 Office of the President of Iran
 Office of the President of Myanmar
 Office of the President (Nepal)
 Office of the President of the Philippines
 Presidential Executive Office of Russia
 Office of the President (South Korea)
 Office of the President (South Sudan)
 Presidential Secretariat (Sri Lanka)
 Office of the President of Ukraine
 Executive Office of the President of the United States
 Oval Office, the room used as the office of the president of the United States
 White House Office, an entity within the Executive Office of the President of the United States

See also
Cabinet Office (disambiguation)
Prime Minister's Office (disambiguation)